Platymantis dorsalis (Dumeril's wrinkled ground frog or common forest frog) is a species of frog in the family Ceratobatrachidae. It is endemic to the northern and central Philippines. Its natural habitats are subtropical or tropical moist lowland forests, subtropical or tropical moist montane forests, plantations, rural gardens, and heavily degraded former forests. It is threatened by habitat loss.

Range
Platymantis dorsalis is known from mainland Luzon, Batan Island, Polillo, Catanduanes, Tablas, Romblon, Marinduque, Cebu, Negros, and Panay islands.

References

Platymantis
Amphibians of the Philippines
Endemic fauna of the Philippines
Taxa named by Auguste Duméril
Amphibians described in 1853
Taxonomy articles created by Polbot